Andover station is an MBTA Commuter Rail station in Andover, Massachusetts. It serves the Haverhill Line. The station has one platform with a mini-high platform for handicapped accessibility serving one track, while the second track lacks a platform. The previous station building, used from 1907 to 1959, is still extant; it was added to the National Register of Historic Places in 1982 as Third Railroad Station.

History

The Andover and Wilmington Railroad opened between its namesake cities in August 1836 as a branch line off the new Boston and Lowell Railroad (B&L). A small wooden Greek revival station was built near the center of Andover. The line was soon extended north, and in 1842 in merged into the Boston and Maine Railroad (B&M). After building its own route to Boston in 1845, the B&M looked to expand its passenger base to compete with the B&L. In 1848, the B&M relocated its main line from Ballardvale to North Andover to the west in order to serve the new mill town of Lawrence.

The line was moved several blocks west in Andover, away from the busy intersections of the town square. A small house was converted into a temporary station, which was soon replaced by a larger L-shaped station with a large train shed. A brick freight house was built sometime between then and 1875.

In 1906, the B&M began construction of a new station, as residents complained about the smoky conditions inside the train shed. The new station, a copy of Beverly Depot designed by Bradford Lee Gilbert a decade earlier, opened on September 1, 1907. It was used as the station until 1959. It was later converted for commercial use, housing an auto parts store by 1977. In 1982, it was added to the National Register of Historic Places as Third Railroad Station. 

In November 1974, North Andover and Andover declined to renew their subsidies. Service to North Andover station ended on November 15. Days before, Andover commuters and businesses raised funds to continue service until April 1975. On April 7, 1975, town residents voted "overwhelmingly" to reimburse the commuters and subsidize service for an additional year. The town declined to subsidize further service, and the three Andover stops (Shawsheen, Andover, and ) were dropped effective April 2, 1976. The round trip, by then stopping just at Lawrence, Bradford and Haverhill, was ended in June 1976. The MBTA bought all B&M commuter equipment and lines on December 27, 1976, including the Western Route from Wilmington Junction to the New Hampshire border.

Service to Haverhill, including the stop at Andover, resumed on December 17, 1979. A mini-high platform for accessibility was added around 1992. MBTA passengers board from a single platform behind the former freight house. Both the former station and former freight house have been repurposed for commercial use. A second track was built through the station in 2015–2017. The originally-planned second MBTA platform was not built; the second track is largely used for idling freight trains.

See also
National Register of Historic Places listings in Andover, Massachusetts
National Register of Historic Places listings in Essex County, Massachusetts

References

External links

 MBTA – Andover
 Station from Google Maps Street View

Stations along Boston and Maine Railroad lines
MBTA Commuter Rail stations in Essex County, Massachusetts

Railway stations on the National Register of Historic Places in Massachusetts
Shingle Style architecture in Massachusetts
Railway stations in the United States opened in 1906
Buildings and structures in Andover, Massachusetts
National Register of Historic Places in Andover, Massachusetts